Paxman may refer to:

Organisations
 Paxman Musical Instruments, a British manufacturer of horns
 Paxman Promotions, a video game reissue and compilation publisher
 Paxman (engines), originally Davey, Paxman & Davey, Engineers latterly part of English Electric and GEC and now part of MAN AG as MAN B&W Diesel Ltd, Paxman

People
 Jeremy Paxman (born 1950), English broadcaster, journalist and author
 Giles Paxman (born 1951), British diplomat 
 Mike Paxman (born 1953), multi-instrumentalist and record producer
 Stephen Paxman (born 1970), Australian rules footballer

Other uses
 Paxman, a fictional character in the Darkover series by Marion Zimmer Bradley